The Astoria Elks Building, also known as Astoria B.P.O.E. Lodge No. 180 Building, is an Elks building in Astoria, Oregon, that is listed on the National Register of Historic Places.  It was built in 1923 and has a Beaux Arts architectural style.  It was listed on the National Register  in 1990.

It was completed in 1923.  It has an "American Renaissance motif".  Two sides have a "variegated brick veneer, broken into bays with pilasters and topped by terra cotta and crimped wrought iron."  Its lower floor was designed for commercial use, and the upper floors reserved for use by the Elks lodge.

See also
 National Register of Historic Places listings in Clatsop County, Oregon

References

Beaux-Arts architecture in Oregon
Buildings and structures completed in 1923
Clubhouses on the National Register of Historic Places in Oregon
Elks buildings
National Register of Historic Places in Astoria, Oregon
1923 establishments in Oregon
Individually listed contributing properties to historic districts on the National Register in Oregon